Meriden Township may refer to the following townships in the United States:

 Meriden Township, LaSalle County, Illinois
 Meriden Township, Steele County, Minnesota